Events in the year 1744 in Norway.

Incumbents
Monarch: Christian VI

Events
 31 December - The town of Holmestrand was founded.

Arts and literature

Births
15 September - Erik Must Angell, jurist and politician (died 1814)
19 November - Jakob Edvard Colbjørnsen, chief justice (died 1802)

Full date unknown
Catharina Lysholm,  businesswoman and ship-owner (died 1815)
Jacob Juel, timber trader and civil servant (died 1800)

Deaths

See also